The University Library of the TU Berlin and UdK is the central library of the Technical University of Berlin (TU Berlin) and the Berlin University of the Arts (UdK). It is located in the Fasanenstraße, Berlin. The current directors of the UdK and TU libraries are Andrea Zeyns and Jürgen Christof, respectively.

History 
Until 2004, each of the 17 departments of the TU Berlin had their own libraries. The catalogue of some of these libraries are now housed in the central library. On October 18, 2004, the new building was opened for public use. The first four floors are used by the TU and the fifth floor by the UdK. Apart from the central library several other libraries (school and department libraries) exists as part of the library system of the TU Berlin.

The building was built with a budget of EUR 56.3 million. Half of this was paid by the federal government, the other half by the TU and the Volkswagenstiftung. Construction began in the summer of 2002 and the library was officially opened on December 9, 2004.

Gallery

Bibliography 
 Rüdiger Scheidges: Zu viele Hintertürchen. In: Der Spiegel (March 12, 2001), pp. 34–35.
 Wolfgang Zick, Andreas Richter, Uwe Meyer-Brunswick: Gemeinsamer Neubau der Universitätsbibliotheken der Technischen Universität Berlin (TU) und der Universität der Künste Berlin (UdK). In: Bibliothek 27 (2003), pp. 65–68.

External links 

 Official page of the TU central library
 Official page of the UdK library

Libraries in Berlin
Technical University of Berlin
Libraries established in 2004